The 1998 Ohio Bobcats football team was an American football team that represented Ohio University in the Mid-American Conference (MAC) during the 1998 NCAA Division I-A football season. In their fourth season under head coach Jim Grobe, the Bobcats compiled a 5–6 record (5–3 against MAC opponents), finished in a tie for third place in the MAC's East Division, and were outscored by all opponents by a combined total of 303 to 269.  They played their home games in Peden Stadium in Athens, Ohio.

Schedule

References

Ohio
Ohio Bobcats football seasons
Ohio Bobcats football